Tri Hita Karana is a traditional philosophy for life on the island of Bali, Indonesia. The literal translation is roughly the "three causes of well-being" or "three reasons for prosperity."

The three causes referred to in the principle are:
 Harmony with God
 Harmony among people
 Harmony with nature or environment

It is derived from the Balinese spiritualism and beliefs, which promotes harmony among fellow human beings through communal cooperation and promoting compassion; harmony towards God, manifested in numerous rituals and offerings to appease deities; and harmony with their environment, which strive to conserve the nature and promote the sustainability and balance of the environment. Tri Hita Karana is credited for the island's prosperity as a whole, its relatively stable record of development, environmental practices, and the overall quality of life for its residents.

The principle of Tri Hita Karana guides many aspects of Balinese life, from daily rituals, communal gotong-royong cooperation practice, to spatial organization in Balinese architecture. It is also reflected in the natural irrigation system on the island known as subak, which consists of cooperatively managed weirs and canals that draw from a single water source. Former President of Indonesia, Susilo Bambang Yudhoyono, even invoked it in his address to the International Conference on Sustainable Development during APEC 2013, which was held in Bali.

References

Balinese culture
Harmony
Philosophy of life